Joe Lewis may refer to:

 Joe Lewis (baseball) (1895–1986), American Negro league baseball player
 Joe E. Lewis (1902–1971), American comedian
 Joe Lewis (British businessman) (born 1937), British currency trader and businessman
 Joe Lewis (martial artist) (1944–2012), American martial artist
 Joe Lewis (artist) (born 1953), American visual artist, photographer, musician, and art critic
 Joe Lewis (footballer, born 1987), English football goalkeeper (Peterborough United, Aberdeen FC)
 Joe Lewis (footballer, born 1999), English football defender (Torquay United)

See also
 Joe Louis (1914–1981), American boxer
 Joe Louis (disambiguation)
 Joseph Lewis (disambiguation)